Haitam Abaida El Achhab (born 1 June 2002) is a footballer who plays for Spanish club Málaga CF. Mainly a left winger, he can also play as a right back. Born in Spain, he represented Morocco at youth international level.

Club career
Born in Polinyà, Barcelona, Catalonia to Moroccan parents, Abaida joined FC Barcelona's La Masia in 2012, from Fundació Calella. In August 2017, after being out of action due to a FIFA ban on Barça, he joined Málaga CF.

On 6 January 2021, before even having appeared for the reserves, Abaida made his first team debut by coming on as a late substitute for fellow youth graduate David Larrubia in a 1–0 home win against Real Oviedo, for the season's Copa del Rey.

References

External links

2002 births
Living people
People from Vallès Occidental
Sportspeople from the Province of Barcelona
Moroccan footballers
Morocco youth international footballers
Spanish footballers
Footballers from Catalonia
Spanish sportspeople of Moroccan descent
Association football wingers
Tercera División players
Atlético Malagueño players
Málaga CF players